David James Jonathan Thompson (born 11 March 1976) is a former English cricketer active from 1994 to 2000 who played for Surrey and Essex. He appeared in eleven first-class matches as a righthanded batsman who bowled right arm medium-fast pace. He scored 109 runs with a highest score of 22 and held one catch. He took 29 wickets with a best analysis of four for 46.

Notes

1976 births
English cricketers
Essex cricketers
Surrey cricketers
Living people